The 2019–20 UMBC Retrievers men's basketball team represented the University of Maryland, Baltimore County in the 2019–20 NCAA Division I men's basketball season. The Retrievers, led by fourth-year head coach Ryan Odom, played their home games at the UMBC Event Center in Catonsville, Maryland as members of the America East Conference. They finished the season 16–17, 8–8 in America East play to finish in a tie for fourth place. They defeated New Hampshire in the quarterfinals of the America East tournament before losing in the semifinals to Vermont.

Previous season
The Retrievers finished the 2018–19 season 21–13 overall, 11–5 in America East Conference play, to finish in a third place. In the America East tournament, they defeated Albany in the quarterfinals, Hartford in the semifinals, before falling to Vermont in the championship game.

Roster

Schedule and results

|-
!colspan=12 style=| Non-conference regular season

|-
!colspan=9 style=| America East Conference regular season

|-
!colspan=12 style=| America East tournament
|-

|-

Source

References

UMBC Retrievers men's basketball seasons
UMBC Retrievers
UMBC Retrievers men's basketball
UMBC Retrievers men's basketball